Marcel Maréchal (25 December 1937 – 11 June 2020) was a French actor, writer, and director.

Biography
Since 1958, Maréchal had a successful acting career. That year, he founded the Théâtre du Cothurne in Lyon. Other theatres he worked at included the Théâtre du Huitième, the Théâtre du Gymnase, Théâtre National de la Criée, Théâtre du Rond-Point, and Trétaux de France.

In 2001, Maréchal founded the Festival Théâtral de Figeac. Throughout his career, he dedicated himself to contemporary playwrights such as Jacques Audiberti, Jean Vauthier, and Louis Guilloux. He was invited to the Festival d'Avignon on several occasions.

Marcel Maréchal died on 11 June 2020 in Paris at the age of 82.

Filmography

Cinema
Trotsky (1967)
I as in Icarus (1979) - Rivoli, un cobaye
Instinct de femme (1981) - Pierre, le mari de Marthe
Il y a maldonne (1988) - William
Simple mortel (1991) - L'homme du parking
Fanfan (1993) - Le père de Fanfan
Le Plus Beau Pays du monde (1999) - Roland, commissaire aux affaires juives

Television
Fracasse (1974, TV Movie) - Professeur
La Belle Époque (1979, TV Movie) - Gustave Hervé
Cinéma 16 (1980) - Teddy Marly
C'améra une première (1981) - Eole Epifanio
Le Fleuve rouge (1981, TV Movie) - Le prof. Roland / L'homme à la canne / Zaganski / Stanislavski / Staline
Nous te mari-e-rons (1981, TV Movie) - Jeannot
Life of Galileo (1982) - Galilée
Lettres d'une mère à son fils (1984, TV Short) - Jouhandeau
Le Cœur du voyage (1984, TV Movie) - Le commandant
Julien Fontanes, magistrat (1987) - Arnaud Surruguet
Au nom du peuple français (1988) - Louis XVI
Navarro (1991)
L'histoire du samedi (1996) - Serge
Commandant Nerval: À qui profite le crime ? (1996) - Valadol
Meurtres sans risques (1998, TV Movie) - Marcel Gallais
Nestor Burma : La Plus Noble Conquête de Nestor (1998) - Godefroy
La femme du boulanger (1999, TV Movie) - Le marquis Castan de Venelles
La Trilogie Marseillaise (2000, TV Movie) - Le docteur (final film role)

Publications
La Mise en théâtre (1974)
Une anémone pour Guignol (1975)
Les Trois Mousquetaires (1982)
Approches de "la Vie de Galilée" de Bertolt Brecht (1982)
Conversation avec Marcel Maréchal (1983)
L'Arbre de mai (1984)
Capitaine Fracasse (1987)
Un colossal enfant (1991)
Rhum-Limonade (1995)
Saltimbanque (2004)
La Très Mirifique Épopée Rabelais (2005)

Awards
Prix du Syndicat de la critique for Best Comedian (1969)
Molière Award director nomination for Mr Puntila and his Man Matti (1992)
Molière Award actor nomination for Mr Puntila and his Man Matti (1992)

References

1937 births
2020 deaths
20th-century French male actors
21st-century French male actors
French directors
Mass media people from Lyon